81st Regiment may refer to:

 81st Regiment of Foot (Aberdeenshire Highland Regiment), a unit of the British Army, 1777–1783
 81st Regiment of Foot (Loyal Lincoln Volunteers), a unit of the British Army 
 81st Infantry Regiment (Philippine Commonwealth Army), a unit of the Philippine Commonwealth Army during the Second World War from 1942 to 1946. 
 81st Infantry Regiment (Imperial Japanese Army), a unit of the Japanese Army
 81st Assault Aviation Regiment, later Fighter-Bomber regiment, an aviation unit of the Yugoslav Air Force

American Civil War
 81st Illinois Volunteer Infantry Regiment, a unit of the Union (Northern) Army
 81st Indiana Infantry Regiment, a unit of the Union (Northern) Army 
 81st New York Volunteer Infantry, a unit of the Union (Northern) Army 
 81st Ohio Infantry, a unit of the Union (Northern) Army 
 81st Pennsylvania Infantry, a unit of the Union (Northern) Army

See also
 81st Division (disambiguation)
 81st Brigade (disambiguation)
 81st Squadron (disambiguation)